Agoult is a surname. People with this surname include:

 Charles Constance César Joseph Matthieu d'Agoult (1747–1824), French bishop
 Reforce d'Agoult, Angevin seneschal of medieval Lombardy
 Marie d'Agoult (1805–1876), Franco-German romantic author and historian
 Raymond Agoult (1911–1992), English conductor